CHOX-FM is a Canadian radio station that broadcasts a francophone adult contemporary format at 97.5 FM in La Pocatière, Quebec.

The station originally signed on as CHGB in 1938 and changed through a number of different AM frequencies, until it moved to its last spot at 1310 AM before being authorized to move to the FM band in 1990 and adopting its current callsign. On April 23, 1992, CHOX signed on and in June 1992, the former AM transmitters left the air.

The station is currently owned by Groupe Radio Simard.

Transmitters

References

External links
CHOX 97,5
 

Hox
Hox
Hox
Hox
Radio stations established in 1938
1938 establishments in Quebec